Dehurda is a village in Balasore district, Odisha state, India.

References

Villages in Balasore district